The 1850 New York state election was held tuesday on November 5, 1850, to elect the Governor, the Lieutenant Governor, a Canal Commissioner, an Inspector of State Prisons and the Clerk of the Court of Appeals, as well as all members of the New York State Assembly.

History
The Democratic state convention met on September 11 in Syracuse and nominated Hunker Seymour and Barnburners Church, Mather, Angel and Benton. 

The Liberty convention met on September 12, and nominated Chaplin and Plumb.

The Whig state convention met on September 27 in Syracuse; Francis Granger presided. After the nominations of Hunt (the sitting State Comptroller), Cornell, Blakely, Baker and Smith had been made, the majority of the convention passed a resolution approving the political course of United States Senator William H. Seward, and the minority, led by Granger, withdrew from the convention and re-assembled elsewhere. This faction, the conservative Whigs which favored a compromise on the slavery question and supported President Millard Fillmore's course, became known as the "Silver Grays", after Granger's white hair.

The Silver Grays state convention met on October 17 in Utica, Granger presided again. Nevertheless, the Syracuse nominations were endorsed.

The Anti-Rent state convention met in Albany and nominated a cross-endorsed ticket with Whigs Hunt and Blakely, and Democrats Church, Angel and Benton.

Results
Hunt won this election with one of the smallest majorities in New York history, only 262 votes. Four out of five candidates on the cross-endorsed Anti-Rent ticket were elected, showing their still present but waning influence. The incumbent Benton was re-elected.

82 Whigs, 44 Democrats, 1 Free Soil and 1 Independent were elected to the State Assembly of the 74th New York State Legislature.

Notes

Sources
Result for Gov. and Lt. Gov. in Manual of the Corporation of the City of New York (1852; page 367)
"Monthly Record of Current Events", Harper's Magazine, Volume 1, p. 849.
A Political History of the State of New York by De Alva Stanwood Alexander (BiblioBazaar, LLC, 2008, ; pages 155ff)
Result in The Tribune Almanac 1851

See also
New York gubernatorial elections
New York state elections

1850
 
New York